Wenzl is a surname. Notable people with the surname include:

Josef Wenzl (born 1984), German cross country skier
Richard Wenzl (died 1957), German World War I flying ace

See also
Wenzel
Wentzel

Surnames from given names
German-language surnames